The large moth family Gelechiidae contains the following genera:

Lacharissa
Lachnostola
Lacistodes
Lanceopenna
Lanceoptera
Larcophora
Laris
Lasiarchis
Lata
Latrologa
Leistogenes
Leptogeneia
Lerupsia
Leucogoniella
Leucophylla
Leuronoma
Lexiarcha
Limenarchis
Lioclepta
Locharcha
Logisis
Lophaeola
Lutilabria
Lysipatha

References

 Natural History Museum Lepidoptera genus database

Gelechiidae
Gelechiid